Ariaca was a region of Western India beyond Barigaza, mentioned in ancient geographical sources, usually associated with the Western Satraps.

According to the Periplus of the Erythraean Sea, Ariaca was part of the kingdom of Nambanus, though to be the Western Satrap ruler Nahapana:

Ptolemy further describes Ariaca as being composed of the cities of Suppara (Sopara), Dunga, Symilla emporium (Chaul), Balepatna, Hippocura, ending before the city of Mandagora.

Notes

Ancient Indian geography